Homalopteroides weberi is a species of the genus Homalopteroides in the family Balitoridae. It is found in west Borneo.

References

Balitoridae
Fish described in 1932